Wolfgang Mair (born 17 February 1980) is an Austrian footballer.

Club career
Born in East Tyrol, the diminutive Mair started his professional career at FC Tirol Innsbruck and stayed with them for 7 years, besides one season in between at SV Pasching. He won three league titles at Tirol and moved to ambitious Red Bull Salzburg in 2005 only to leave them after one season playing off the substitutes' bench for Vienna giants Austria Wien. He won the Austrian Cup with them and joined Austria Kärnten in summer 2008.

International career
He made his debut for Austria in a February 2005 friendly match against Latvia. He earned 3 caps, no goal scored. His other two international games were March 2005 World Cup qualification matches against Wales.

Honours
Austrian Football Bundesliga (3):
 2000, 2001, 2002
Austrian Cup (1):
 2007

External links
Player profile - Austria Kärnten
Profile - Austria Archive

1980 births
Living people
Austrian footballers
Austria international footballers
Austria under-21 international footballers
FC Wacker Innsbruck (2002) players
FC Red Bull Salzburg players
FK Austria Wien players
FC Kärnten players
First Vienna FC players
FC Liefering players
Austrian Football Bundesliga players
Association football forwards
People from Lienz
Footballers from Tyrol (state)
FC Tirol Innsbruck players